The Clean Gun is a 1917 silent film drama directed by Harry Harvey. It is preserved at the Library of Congress.

Cast
Stanley J. Preston - Jack Algers
Edward Jobson - Dean Grayson
Kathleen Kirkham - Matie Norton
Robert Weycross - Senator Norton
William Marshall - Edward Brantonx
Harl McInroy - Doctor Bristow
Charles Edler - Stephen Crawfield
Louise Sothern - Della Markham

References

External links
 

1917 films
American silent feature films
1917 drama films
Silent American drama films
American black-and-white films
1910s American films